Andrea Facchin (born 20 September 1978 in Padova) is an Italian flatwater canoer who has competed since 1999. Competing in two Summer Olympics, he won a bronze medal in the K-2 1000 m event at Beijing in 2008.

Facchin's greatest success came in 2002 when he won a bronze medal at the European Championships in the K-4 500 m event. He also won the K-1 500 m event at the 1999 Military World Games.

For the specific weight training programme, his strength coach was Master Paolo Tassetto.

References

External links
 
 
 
 Statistics at guardiadifinanza.it 

1978 births
Canoeists at the 2004 Summer Olympics
Canoeists at the 2008 Summer Olympics
Italian male canoeists
Living people
Olympic canoeists of Italy
Olympic bronze medalists for Italy
Olympic medalists in canoeing
Canoeists of Fiamme Gialle
Medalists at the 2008 Summer Olympics
Mediterranean Games bronze medalists for Italy
Competitors at the 2005 Mediterranean Games
Mediterranean Games medalists in canoeing
20th-century Italian people
21st-century Italian people